General elections were held in Kenya in May 1948.

Electoral system
The seats in the Legislative Council were distributed according to a race-based franchise. Eleven Europeans were elected from single-member constituencies defined as Part A; five Indians (two of which were required to be Muslims) were elected from three Part B constituencies, and one Arab was elected from a single nationwide Part C constituency. Four Africans and nine Europeans were nominated members.

Results

Elected members

Appointed members

References

1948 elections in Africa
1948
1948 in Kenya
Legislative Council of Kenya
1948
May 1948 events in Africa